The Heinkel He 114 was a sesquiwing reconnaissance seaplane produced for the Kriegsmarine in the 1930s for use from warships. It replaced the company's He 60, but did not remain in service long before being replaced in turn by the Arado Ar 196 as Germany's standard observation seaplane.

Design and development
While the fuselage and flotation gear of the He 114 were completely conventional, its wing arrangement was highly unusual. The upper set of wings was attached to the fuselage with a set of cabane struts, as in a parasol wing monoplane, whereas the lower set was of much lesser span while having approximately the same chord. (Note that this general layout isn't especially unusual, and is known as a "Sesquiplane", or a biplane which has a smaller lower wing. Typically, the lower wing is about 3/4 of the span of the upper wing, and has a smaller chord as well. The He 114 has a much shorter lower wing than usual, but has the same chord as the upper wing, which keeps the wing area ratio similar.)

Operational history
The He 114 was never a great success, was not built in large numbers, and served with the Luftwaffe for only a short time. While the He 60 had handled very well on the water but been sluggish in the air, the He 114's handling while afloat was poor and its performance in the air scarcely better than the aircraft it replaced.

A total of 24 aircraft were exported to Romania, where the last 8 remained in service until 1 May 1960. In July 1943 Spain acquired a total number of 12 aircraft of the A and C variants, they were retired in 1954.

On 1 November 1939 Sweden ordered 12 aircraft of the B-1 variant, the aircraft were planned to be delivered in December the same year but was soon rescheduled to Spring the following year. In April 1940 Sweden increased the order by 24 aircraft, Heinkel responded by informing that the original order would not be delivered as the German government had enacted a ban on military materiel export to Sweden. When the ban was lifted the 12 aircraft originally intended for Sweden had already been taken into service of the Luftwaffe. By the end of 1940 Germany gave notice that it could deliver 12 aircraft, Sweden accepted but Germany soon cancelled the order. The purchase could however be realized in 1941 and 12 used He 114 arrived to Sweden dismantled in boxes in spring the same year. The airplanes were assembled and given a complete overhaul before entering service at Roslagens flygflottilj (F2) in Hägernäs under the designation S 12 (S being an abbreviation for 'reconnaissance aircraft' in Sweden).

Surviving aircraft
In 2012, two divers discovered the wreckage of a Heinkel 114 at the bottom of Lake Siutghiol, in Romania. Near the Heinkel were also sections of two other seaplanes: a Savoia-Marchetti S.55 and a Junkers W 34.

Variants
He 114A-0
10 pre-production aircraft, powered by a 656 kW (880 hp) BMW 132Dc engine.
He 114A-1
Training version, powered by a 656 kW (880 hp) BMW 132Dc engine, 33 built.
He 114A-2
Main production shipborne version.
He 114B-1
Export version of the He 114A-2 for Sweden, 12 built.
He 114B-2
Export version of the He 114A-2 for Romania, six built.
He 114B-3
Export version for Romania, 12 built.
He 114C-1
Reconnaissance biplane for the Luftwaffe, 14 built.
He 114C-2
Unarmed shipborne (Kriegsmarine commerce raider) version, four built.

Operators

Luftwaffe

Royal Romanian Naval Aviation received 24 aircraft.
Romanian Air Force operated several aircraft until 1960.

Spanish Air Force
Spanish Navy

Swedish Air Force

Specifications (He 114A-2)

See also

References

Notes

Bibliography

 Donald, David, ed. Warplanes of the Luftwaffe. London: Aerospace, 1994. .
 Smith J. R. and Kay, Anthony. German Aircraft of the Second World War. London: Putnam & Company, 1972. .

1930s German military reconnaissance aircraft
Floatplanes
He 114
Sesquiplanes
Single-engined tractor aircraft
Aircraft first flown in 1936